This list features two sortable tables of art works on permanent public display in Boston, Massachusetts and its neighborhoods

It comprises works of public art, including sculpture, relief panels, tablets and fountains with sculptural features, accessible in an outdoor public spaces or inside state or federally owned public buildings. This does not include artwork visible inside museums or visible only on private property.

This table is not complete and most likely will not include recent installations. Please feel welcome to contribute/add these in the Additional Artworks area below.

Usage
The tables' columns (except for note, Type and Image) are sortable by pressing the arrows symbols. The following gives an overview of what information is included in the table.
Name: The artwork's commonly used name or name as it has been entered on its Wikipedia page (where it has one) 
Artist: name of the primary artist(s) or designer(s) if known. 
Year: variously the artwork's installation date; date of creation; or date of reinstallation at its current location
Location: the street, park, intersection or plaza where the artwork is currently located
Material: the main material(s) from which the artwork is constructed
Dimensions: the approximate dimensions of the artwork, where known
Notes: additional information, including ownership or known repairwork
Image: a picture of the artwork, where available
This page seeks to be an aggregate list of general facts. For information on individual sculptures, please visit the individual artwork's pages.

Artworks

City of Boston 
Includes: Back Bay, Boston, North End, South End, Boston

Boston Neighborhoods  
Includes: Charlestown, East Boston, and Jamaica Plain (Cambridge has its own page)

Additional Artwork 
Split Dodecahedron, 2012, Don Tellalian, Rose Kennedy Greenway
Citgo sign, 1965, Kenmore Square
Giant Milk Bottle by Arthur Gagner, 1934
“Bunker Hill Monument” by Solomon Willard, 1842, Charlestown
Rainbow gas tank (untitled, but often called the “Rainbow Swash”) by Corita Kent, 1971, Dorcester
Roxbury Love Mural by Ricardo "Deme5" Gomez and Thomas “Kwest” Burns, 2014, spray paint, 17 ft. x 100 ft., Roxbury. Removed 2020.

References

Public art
Culture of Boston
Boston
 
Public art in Massachusetts
Tourist attractions in Boston